Clovia is a genus of true bugs belonging to the family Aphrophoridae.

The genus has almost cosmopolitan distribution.

Species

Species:

Clovia albomarginata 
Clovia altipeta 
Clovia amieti

References

Aphrophoridae
Hemiptera genera